Lieutenant-Colonel George Gawler, KH, (21 July 1795 – 7 May 1869) was the second Governor of South Australia, at the same time serving as Resident Commissioner, from 17 October 1838 until 15 May 1841.

Biography

Early life
Gawler, born on 21 July 1795, was the only child of Captain Samuel Gawler, captain in the 73rd Regiment of Foot, and his wife Julia, née Russell. Gawler's father was killed in battle in Mysore, India in December 1804. The Gawler family historically came from Devon. George Gawler was educated by a tutor, then at a school in Cold Bath, Islington. Two years were then spent at the Royal Military College, Great Marlow, where he was a diligent and clever student.

Army service
In October 1810, Gawler obtained a commission as an ensign in the 52nd (Oxfordshire) Regiment of Foot and in January 1812 went to the Peninsular War. He was a member of a storming party at Badajoz, and was wounded and saved from death by a soldier who lost his own life. He was in Spain until 1814, taking part in the advance on Madrid. The regiment returned to England and Gawler, now a lieutenant, fought at the Battle of Waterloo. He remained in France with the army of occupation until 1818, and in 1820 married Maria Cox of Friar Gate, Derby who was the niece of Samuel Richardson. Gawler's new sister-in-law, Mary Ann, married William Leeke, a fellow officer from the 52nd. Gawler and his wife were sincerely religious and when the 52nd was sent to New Brunswick in 1823 they did much social and religious work. Gawler returned to England in 1826 and from 1830 to 1832 was engaged in recruiting. He reached the rank of lieutenant-colonel in 1834 and in 1837 received the Royal Hanoverian Guelphic Order (KH), third class.

South Australia
In 1838 Gawler was appointed Governor of South Australia in succession to Captain John Hindmarsh, who had been recalled, as well as being appointed to the role of Resident Commissioner, taking over from the first incumbent, James Hurtle Fisher. Gawler and his wife and children arrived on the Pestonjee Bomanjee on 12 October 1838, after a four-month journey via Tenerife and Rio de Janeiro. Gawler found the colony had almost no public finances, underpaid officials and 4000 immigrants living in makeshift accommodation. He was allowed a maximum of £12,000 expenditure a year, with an additional £5,000 credit for emergencies.

His first goal was to address delays over rural settlement and primary production. He persuaded Charles Sturt to come from New South Wales to work as surveyor-general, personally overseeing the surveys in the meantime, as Colonel William Light had resigned due to ailing health and the demands placed on him with insufficient staff. Gawler promptly increased and reorganised the fledgling police force, promoting its commander Henry Inman. Gawler appointed more colonial officials, took part in exploration, and improved the facilities at Port Adelaide during his tenure as governor. The first permanent Government House was built, which is now the East Wing of the present building.

The South Australian Company's greatest source of revenue, the sale of land, had largely dried up due to surveying delays in 1838. The rapid increase in population in 1839 and 1840 due to immigration greatly added to the unemployment problem. Droughts in other Australian colonies in 1840, before South Australia was self-sufficient in food, drove up the cost of living rapidly. Gawler increased public expenditure to stave off collapse, which resulted in bankruptcy and changes to the way the colony was run. Over £200,000 had been spent and the land fund in London had been exhausted. A£155,000 loan was approved by the British Parliament (later made a gift) and Captain George Grey was sent to replace Gawler, after Grey promised to "maintain the strictest economy". In his time in office Governor Grey helped make South Australia self-sufficient in terms of agriculture and restored public confidence, though the real salvation of the colony may have been the discovery of copper at Burra in 1845.

Later life and death
After retirement as governor in 1841, Gawler devoted his time to religious and charitable works.

In 1845, Gawler wrote a memorandum, The Tranquillization of Syria and the East, in which he suggested that Jews be allowed to establish Jewish agricultural settlements in Palestine as compensation for their suffering under Turkish rule. The Emancipation of the Jews followed in 1847, and in 1849 he toured Palestine with Moses Montefiore. In a further work, Syria and its Near Prospects, (1853) he made four arguments for the proposition that Jewish settlement was already under way.

In 1850 Gawler retired from the army. In the same year, he wrote Present State of Moral Principle in the Supreme Government of the British Colonial Empire, in which he petitioned the Queen seeking redress for the injustices done to him by successive secretaries of state. Accusing George Grey of dishonesty, he claimed that it had been through his efforts that South Australia was "the only cheap and brilliantly successful new colony in modern history".
 
Gawler spent his last years at Southsea, where he died of pneumonia on 7 May 1869. He was buried at Portsmouth.

Legacy

Gawler's work was long misjudged, largely because his successor Grey, in his dispatches, made the worst of his predecessor's acts, without suggesting the difficulties under which he had worked. Gawler was a gallant and energetic officer who, when he found the settlers faced with disaster, saw at once what it was necessary to do, and saved the colony. Mills however, accepts the view that Gawler had been guilty of carelessness and extravagance and cannot be wholly acquitted of blame, though the extraordinary difficulties with which he was faced are acknowledged. Charles Sturt and other men at the time generally agreed that his administration had greatly benefited the settlement, and the select committee on South Australia reported that the critics of his expenditure were "unable to point out any specific item by which it could have been considerably reduced without great public inconvenience". Much of Gawler's expenditure was on works of both immediate and long-lasting benefit to the Colony and the State, such as the Great Eastern Road. Many modern historians put him among the founders of South Australia.

The town of Gawler was named after him, as well as the adjoining river.

The Gawler Ranges at the north end of Eyre Peninsula are also named after him by the explorer Edward John Eyre in 1839.

Gawler's reputation was somewhat tarnished by his involvement in the Maria massacre in 1840.

Derby's Town and County Museum in the 1830s included Gawler in its list of principal benefactors. Gawler had contributed a collection of minerals and exotic stuffed birds which included an albatross from his time as governor. Also, Gawler's gardener in Australia, Joseph Whittaker, contributed hundreds of pressed flowers and plants to Derby Museum and to Kew Gardens.

A portrait of him hangs in Parliament House, Adelaide, and another in the City Council Chamber, Adelaide.

Gawler's eldest surviving son, Henry (1827-1894), returned to South Australia in 1858. He was a solicitor in the South Australian Land Titles Office from 1858 to 1884.

One of his grandsons, Douglas Gawler, was a member of parliament in Western Australia.

See also
 
 Historical Records of Australia
 Maria (brigantine)
 Thomas Shuldham O'Halloran

References

Further reading
 

 – Memorials and Monuments in Portsmouth, Hampshire, UK

Governors of South Australia
Governors of the Colony of South Australia
Graduates of the Royal Military College, Great Marlow
52nd Regiment of Foot officers
British Army personnel of the Napoleonic Wars
1795 births
1869 deaths
People associated with Derby Museum and Art Gallery
British colonial governors and administrators in Oceania